†Centrifugus is an extinct species of fossil sea snail, a marine gastropod mollusk in the family Euomphalidae, which paleontologists place in the order Archaeogastropoda.

This species was originally known from the Upper Silurian  of northern Europe (Gotland).

Description
The shell has a nearly flat spire, and is widest across the base, which is marked by a peripheral keel. The upper side of the aperture has a narrow slit, and a selenizone located close to the upper suture. Five strong spiral cords alternating with weaker ones cover the upper surface of the shell.

References
 J.Brooks Knight et al. 1960. Systematic Descriptions. Treatise on Invertebrate Paleontology Part I Mollusca 1. Geological Society of America and University of Kansas Press.

Silurian gastropods
Fossils of Sweden